Godfrey Moyo (born 5 December 1985) is a retired Zimbabwean football defender.

References

1985 births
Living people
Zimbabwean footballers
Motor Action F.C. players
Zimbabwe international footballers
Association football defenders
Zimbabwe Premier Soccer League players